Colle or Collé is a surname. Notable people with the surname include:

Charles Collé, French dramatist and songwriter
Edgard Colle, Belgian chess master
Florence Colle, French sportswoman 
Raffaellino del Colle, Italian mannerist
Ronald Collé, American metrologist

See also

Calle (name)